Sânmihaiu Român ( or Oláhszentmihály) is a commune in Timiș County, Romania. It is composed of three villages: Sânmihaiu German, Sânmihaiu Român (commune seat) and Utvin.

Name

History 
The first recorded mention of Sânmihaiu Român dates from 1333, being mentioned in the papal tithe records with the name Sanctus Michael. Historian Ioan Lotreanu considers that the assignment of this name is erroneous, being confused with Sveti Mihajlo in Serbian Banat. However, there are also later mentions in documents, such as a diploma from 1350 in which the locality is named Sanctus Mychael.

Old Romanian village, it resisted the Turkish occupation, so that in 1717, after the conquest of Banat by the Austrians, it had 40 houses. It then appears written on Count Mercy's map from 1723–1725 and on maps from 1761 and 1783. The Romanian church was built in 1774.

In the interwar period it was part of Plasa Chișoda, Timiș-Torontal County, it had over 2,000 inhabitants and over 500 houses.

Demographics 

Sânmihaiu Român had a population of 6,121 inhabitants at the 2011 census, up 39% from the 2002 census. Most inhabitants are Romanians (88.01%), with a minority of Hungarians (2.45%). For 7.47% of the population, ethnicity is unknown. By religion, most inhabitants are Orthodox (73.7%), but there are also minorities of Pentecostals (9.67%), Roman Catholics (3.97%) and Baptists (1.32%). For 7.76% of the population, religious affiliation is unknown.

Notable people 
  (b. 1939), painter, art critic and scientist

Twin towns 
  Mornac

References 

Communes in Timiș County
Localities in Romanian Banat